Peter Mukeba Kalambayi (born June 26, 1995) is an American football linebacker who is a free agent. He played college football at Stanford.

Professional career

Houston Texans
Kalambayi was drafted by the Houston Texans in the sixth round, 214th overall, of the 2018 NFL Draft. He logged 33 tackles with the team through the 2020 season. He was waived on February 23, 2021.

Denver Broncos
On June 7, 2021, Kalambayi signed with the Denver Broncos. He was waived on August 17, 2021.

Green Bay Packers
On December 20, 2021, Kalambayi was signed to the Green Bay Packers practice squad.

References

1995 births
Living people
American sportspeople of Trinidad and Tobago descent
Players of American football from Raleigh, North Carolina
American football linebackers
Stanford Cardinal football players
Houston Texans players
Denver Broncos players
Green Bay Packers players